Travancinha is a village and parish in the Portuguese Seia Municipality. The population in 2011 was 472, in an area of 12.47 km2.

References

External links
(Portuguese) Junta de Freguesia de Travancinha

Freguesias of Seia